Teresa Gallagher is an American-born British actress.

Career 
Gallagher is known for her role as Ellen Smith in The Bill, for her appearances on radio in No Commitments, Salem's Lot, and Memorials to the Missing. She played Sarah in Footballers' Wives, and Alison Canning in Casualty.

She presented the children's BBC show Playdays, and has provided the voices for others children's series including The Mr. Men Show, Alphablocks, Numberblocks, and The Octonauts.

She has recorded redubs for several anime films such as Laughing Target, X, Bounty Dog, Demon City Shinjuku, and Cyber City Oedo 808 and later returned to do voice acting for anime with the English dubbed version of the TV series Ronja, the Robber's Daughter.

In 2003, she voiced Amalia, the female lead in Rita Dove's drama The Darker Face of the Earth, opposite Chiwetel Ejiofor in the play's BBC radio adaptation.

In 2010, she voiced Queen Titania, Mrs. Walker, and Fern in the UK version of the movie Rainbow Magic: Return to Rainspell Island. She also does the voice of Matilda, Young Stella, and Zara the Cruzeao in Angry Birds Space.

In 2011, Gallagher provided the voice of Nicole Watterson, the title character's mother, on the Cartoon Network animated series The Amazing World of Gumball.

In 2015, she provided the voice of EOS as well as various minor characters in Thunderbirds Are Go, and now as the role of the titular character in the UK Version of Henry Hugglemonster and the Voice Trumpets and the Tiddlytubbies in the 2015 reboot of Teletubbies.

Gallagher has also done various voice-over work for video games, commercials, radio plays, BBC radio dramas, and audiobooks such as several new Meg Cabot books and the 2007 audiobook adaptation of Charles Dickens's novel Bleak House which became The Times audio book of the year. A member of the BBC Radio Drama Company, she has read Radio 4's Book of the Week and Book at Bedtime.

Filmography

Radio

Television

Film

Video games

References

External links

Teresa Gallagher – Radio

Living people
American emigrants to England
American expatriate actresses in the United Kingdom
American expatriates in England
American film actresses
American radio actresses
American stage actresses
American television actresses
American television hosts
American video game actresses
American voice actresses
American women television presenters
British film actresses
British radio actresses
British stage actresses
British television actresses
British television presenters
British video game actresses
British voice actresses
British women television presenters
National Youth Jazz Orchestra members
Year of birth missing (living people)
20th-century British actresses
21st-century British actresses